Revolución: el cruce de los Andes is a 2010 Argentine historical epic film directed by Leandro Ipiña and starring Rodrigo de la Serna. It premiered during the bicentennial of Argentina. It was initially named San Martín: el cruce de los Andes.

The film follows the life of José de San Martín, with special focus on the Crossing of the Andes. Production was done by Channel 7 and Channel Encuentro. It was premiered in Mar del Plata on November 15, 2010.

Synopsis 
The story starts in 1880, near the date when the remains of the deceased José de San Martín were moved to Buenos Aires. A veteran of the Army of the Andes gets an interview for the event, and the narration continues mostly through a flashback. The telling of the events does not follow the complete biography of San Martín, focusing instead in the Crossing of the Andes and the later Battle of Chacabuco.

Cast 
 Rodrigo de la Serna ... José de San Martín
 Juan Ciancio ... Manuel Corvalán (young)
 León Dogodny ... Manuel Corvalán (old)
 Lautaro Delgado ... Reporter
 Victor Hugo Carrizo ... Villagrán
 Pablo Ribba ... Fray Aldao
 Alberto Morle ... Sargento Blanco
 Guillermo Kuchen ... Mayor Luna
 Alberto Ajaka ... Álvarez Condarco
 Matías Marmorato ... Fray García
 Abel Ezequiel Arabales ... Chasqui
 Martín Rodríguez ... Soler
 Corina Romero ... Landlady
 Javier Olivera ... Bernardo O’Higgins
 Alfredo Castellani ... Corvalán's Father
 Ana Gutiérrez ... Remedios de Escalada
 Lucrecia Oviedo ... Corvalán's Mother
 Juan Carlos Gené ... Narrator

Production 

The production of the movie was announced at Casa Rosada, with the presence of President Cristina Fernández de Kirchner, the governor of the province of San Juan, José Luis Gioja, Minister of Education Juan Carlos Tedesco, the director of the National System of Public Media, Tristán Bauer, and actor Rodrigo de la Serna.

At the announcement, the President stated that "this is a very special moment for everyone because addressing from public television the Crossing the Andes is more than just remember a milestone in the struggle for emancipation." She explained that the movie would focus on the personal traits of San Martin, and pointed that if San Martín "had listened to the voices who say that nothing can be done, that everything is impossible, he would still be in Mendoza and we would be subjects of the King of Spain.".

The filming started on June 1 of 2009 at the Calingasta valley in the province of San Juan, with a crew of more than 100 people. Along with de la Serna, there were 15 principal actors in the film, and more than 1400 extras. The scenes filmed in Mendoza ended up being shot the following August.

References

External links 
 
 Revolución at Distribution Company website

2010 films
2010 war drama films
2010s Spanish-language films
Spanish war drama films
Works about the Argentine War of Independence
Films set in the 1810s
Films set in the 1870s
Films set in the 1880s
Films shot in Argentina
War epic films
War films based on actual events
Cultural depictions of José de San Martín
Films set in Chile
Films set in Argentina
Argentine war drama films
2010 drama films
Argentine action films
2010s Argentine films